The 2018 College Football All-America Team includes those players of American college football who have been honored by various selector organizations as the best players at their respective positions.  The selector organizations award the "All-America" honor annually following the conclusion of the fall college football season.  The original All-America team was the 1889 College Football All-America Team selected by Caspar Whitney and Walter Camp. The National Collegiate Athletic Bureau, which is the National Collegiate Athletic Association's (NCAA) service bureau, compiled, in the 1950, the first list of All-Americans including first-team selections on teams created for a national audience that received national circulation with the intent of recognizing selections made from viewpoints that were nationwide.  Since 1957, College Sports Information Directors of America (CoSIDA) has bestowed Academic All-American recognition on male and female athletes in Divisions I, II, and III of the NCAA as well as National Association of Intercollegiate Athletics athletes, including all NCAA championship sports.

The 2018 College Football All-America Team is composed of the following College Football All-American first teams chosen by the following selector organizations: Associated Press (AP), Football Writers Association of America (FWAA), American Football Coaches Association (AFCA), Walter Camp Foundation (WCFF), Sporting News (TSN, from its historic name of The Sporting News), Sports Illustrated (SI), USA Today (USAT) ESPN, CBS Sports (CBS), College Football News (CFN), Scout.com, Athlon Sports, and Fox Sports (FOX).

Currently, the NCAA compiles consensus all-America teams in the sports of Division I FBS football and Division I men's basketball using a point system computed from All-America teams named by coaches associations or media sources.  Players are chosen against other players playing at their position only.  To be selected a consensus All-American, players must be chosen to the first team on at least two of the five official selectors as recognized by the NCAA.  Second- and third-team honors are used to break ties.  Players named first-team by all five selectors are deemed unanimous All-Americans. Currently, the NCAA recognizes All-Americans selected by the AP, AFCA, FWAA, TSN, and the WCFF to determine consensus and unanimous All-Americans.

Twenty-seven players were recognized as consensus All-Americans for 2018, eight of them being unanimous. Unanimous selections are followed by an asterisk (*).

Offense

Quarterback
Kyler Murray, Oklahoma (AP, FWAA, SI, USAT, CFN, ESPN, CBS)
Tua Tagovailoa, Alabama (AFCA, TSN, WCFF, Athlon)

Running back
Darrell Henderson, Memphis (AFCA, AP, FWAA, WCFF, SI, USAT, CFN, ESPN, CBS, Athlon)
Jonathan Taylor, Wisconsin (AFCA, AP, FWAA, TSN, WCFF, SI, USAT, CFN, CBS, Athlon)
Travis Etienne, Clemson (TSN, ESPN)

Wide receiver
Marquise Brown, Oklahoma (AP, SI, USAT, ESPN, CBS)
Andy Isabella, UMass (AFCA, FWAA, WCFF, USAT, CFN, Athlon)
Jerry Jeudy, Alabama (AFCA, AP, TSN, WCFF, SI, ESPN, CBS, Athlon)
Rondale Moore, Purdue (CFN)
Tylan Wallace, Oklahoma State (TSN, ESPN, Athlon)
Antoine Wesley, Texas Tech (FWAA)

Tight end
Jace Sternberger, Texas A&M (AP, FWAA, TSN, WCFF, SI, CFN, CBS, Athlon)
T. J. Hockenson, Iowa (AFCA, USAT)

Offensive line
Beau Benzschawel, Wisconsin (AFCA, AP, WCFF, SI, USAT, CFN, ESPN, CBS, Athlon)
Garrett Bradbury, North Carolina State (AFCA, AP, FWAA, WCFF, USAT, Athlon)
Michael Deiter, Wisconsin (FWAA)
Lamont Gaillard, Georgia (CFN)
Mitch Hyatt, Clemson (AFCA, AP, FWAA, WCFF, CFN, Athlon)
Michael Jordan, Ohio State (SI, CBS)
Sam Mustipher, Notre Dame (ESPN)
Ross Pierschbacher, Alabama (TSN)
Ben Powers, Oklahoma (AFCA, FWAA, TSN, WCFF, USAT, CFN)
Terrone Prescod, North Carolina State (TSN, ESPN)
Dalton Risner, Kansas State (TSN, USAT, ESPN, CBS, Athlon)
Dru Samia, Oklahoma (SI)
Bunchy Stallings, Kentucky (AP)
Andrew Thomas, Georgia (SI, CBS)
Jonah Williams, Alabama (AFCA, AP, FWAA, TSN, WCFF, SI, USAT, CFN, ESPN, CBS, Athlon)

Defense

Defensive line
Clelin Ferrell, Clemson (AFCA, AP, TSN, WCFF, SI, USAT, CFN, ESPN, CBS, Athlon)
Dre'mont Jones, Ohio State (CFN)
Dexter Lawrence, Clemson (AFCA)
Ed Oliver, Houston (FWAA, WCFF, CBS)
Sutton Smith, Northern Illinois (AP, SI, USAT, CFN, ESPN, Athlon)
Montez Sweat, Mississippi State (FWAA, TSN)
Jerry Tillery, Notre Dame (SI, CBS)
Christian Wilkins, Clemson (AFCA, AP, FWAA, TSN, WCFF, USAT, ESPN, Athlon)
Quinnen Williams, Alabama (AFCA, AP, FWAA, TSN, WCFF, SI, USAT, CFN, ESPN, CBS, Athlon)

Linebacker
Josh Allen, Kentucky (AFCA, AP, FWAA, TSN, WCFF, SI, USAT, CFN, ESPN, CBS, Athlon)
Devin Bush, Michigan (AFCA, FWAA, TSN, WCFF, SI, USAT, CFN, CBS)
Devin White, LSU (AFCA, AP, TSN, WCFF, SI, USAT, CFN, ESPN, CBS, Athlon)
Ben Burr-Kirven, Washington  (AP, FWAA, ESPN, Athlon)

Defensive back
Deandre Baker, Georgia (AFCA, AP, TSN, WCFF, SI, USAT, CFN, ESPN, CBS, Athlon)
Hamp Cheevers, Boston College (FWAA)
Grant Delpit, LSU (AFCA, AP, FWAA, TSN, WCFF, SI, CFN, CBS, Athlon)
Julian Love, Notre Dame (AP, FWAA, TSN, WCFF, SI, USAT, ESPN)
Byron Murphy, Washington (Athlon)
Taylor Rapp, Washington  (USAT, ESPN)
Deionte Thompson, Alabama (AFCA, AP, TSN, SI, USAT, CFN, ESPN, CBS, Athlon)
Greedy Williams, LSU (AFCA, FWAA, WCFF, CFN, CBS)

Special teams

Kicker
Andre Szmyt, Syracuse (AFCA, AP, FWAA, TSN, WCFF, SI, USAT, ESPN, CBS)
Cole Tracy, LSU (CFN, Athlon)

Punter
Braden Mann, Texas A&M (AFCA, AP, FWAA, TSN, WCFF, SI, USAT, ESPN, CFN, CBS, Athlon)

All-purpose / return specialist
Greg Dortch, Wake Forest (FWAA, SI, CBS)
Mecole Hardman, Georgia (ESPN, Athlon)
Darrell Henderson, Memphis (TSN)
Rondale Moore, Purdue (AP, FWAA, SI, USAT, ESPN, CBS, Athlon)
Deebo Samuel, South Carolina (AFCA)
Savon Scarver, Utah State (FWAA, WCFF, CFN, CBS, Athlon)
Isaiah Wright, Temple (TSN)

See also
 2018 All-ACC football team
 2018 All-SEC football team
 2018 All-Big Ten Conference football team
 2018 All-Big 12 Conference football team
 2018 All-Pac-12 Conference football team

Footnotes

References
AP All-America Team
FWAA All-America Team
Walter Camp Football Foundation All-America Team
The Sporting News All-America Team
AFCA All-America Team
Sports Illustrated All-America Team
College Football News All-America Team
ESPN All-America Team
CBS Sports All-America Team
USA Today All-America Team
Athlon Sports All-America Team

All-America Team
College Football All-America Teams